Dingyuan is a town of Yuzhong County in southeastern Gansu province, China. , it has 12 villages under its administration.

See also 
 List of township-level divisions of Gansu

References 

Township-level divisions of Gansu
Yuzhong County